The Innocent Lives Foundation, also known as ILF, is an international nonprofit organization dedicated to finding the true identities of anonymous child predators using open-source intelligence, compiling conclusive reports, and handing the reports over to various types of law enforcement to help bring predators to justice. ILF also works to combat child sexual abuse material by educating parents and guardians on ways to talk to their children about their online activity. The Innocent Lives Foundation was founded by Christopher J. Hadnagy in 2017.

History 
At DEF CON 25 in 2017, Christopher J. Hadnagy announced the creation of the Innocent Lives Foundation. Hadnagy's company Social-Engineer, LLC was involved in a social engineering engagement for a company when his team uncovered Tor traffic from one of the company's employees computers being used to trade child sexual abuse material on the dark web.

Board Members 
 Christopher J. Hadnagy
 Neil Fallon
 Robin Dreeke
 Timothy J. Maloney

Notable Ambassadors 
 A. J. Cook
 Dr. Michelle Ward

References 

Organizations established in 2017